Newry is the fourth largest city in Northern Ireland.

Newry may also refer to:

Places
Australia
 Newry, Victoria
 Newry Islands National Park, Queensland
 Newry Station, Northern Territory cattle station

Canada
 Newry, Ontario

United States
 Newry, Indiana
 Newry, Maine
 Newry, Pennsylvania
 Newry, South Carolina
 Newry Township, Minnesota
 Newry, Wisconsin

Other uses related to Northern Ireland
Northern Ireland constituencies
 Newry (Parliament of Ireland constituency)
 Newry (UK Parliament constituency), former constituency
 Newry and Armagh (Assembly constituency)
 Newry and Armagh (UK Parliament constituency)

Other uses
 Newry (civil parish)
 Newry Canal
 Newry Bosco GFC
 Newry City F.C.
 Newry High School
 Newry River
 Newry and Mourne District Council
 Newry railway station
 The Troubles in Newry, a timeline of incidents